Sicario is a 2015 American action thriller film directed by Denis Villeneuve, written by Taylor Sheridan and starring Emily Blunt, Benicio del Toro, and Josh Brolin. The film follows a principled FBI Special Agent who is enlisted by a government task force to bring down the leader of a powerful and brutal Mexican drug cartel. Sicario was selected to compete for the Palme d'Or at the 2015 Cannes Film Festival. It began a limited release in the United States on September 18, 2015, followed by a nationwide release on October 2, 2015.

Sicario received praise for its screenplay, direction, musical score, cinematography, and the performances of Blunt, Brolin and del Toro. The film was nominated for Best Cinematography, Best Original Score, and Best Sound Editing at the 88th Academy Awards. It also earned BAFTA nominations for Best Supporting Actor, Best Cinematography, and Best Film Music. Its sequel, Sicario: Day of the Soldado, was released on June 29, 2018. A third film, titled Sicario: Capos, is in development.

Plot

In Chandler, Arizona, FBI Special Agents Kate Macer and Reggie Wayne lead a raid on a Sonora Cartel safe house, where they discover dozens of decaying corpses hidden in the walls. Outside, an explosive booby trap kills two police officers. Following the raid, Kate is recommended for and joins a Joint Task Force overseen by CIA Officer Matt Graver and the secretive Alejandro Gillick, an ex-Mexican prosecutor and ex-tax inspector turned CIA-trained assassin. Their mission is to flush out and apprehend Sonora lieutenant Manuel Díaz, currently operating hidden in the US.

The team, which includes Delta Force operators, Deputy US Marshals, and CIA personnel, travels to Juárez, Mexico to extradite Díaz's brother, Guillermo. While crossing the El Paso–Juárez border, the team is ambushed by cartel hitmen, whom Delta Force swiftly kills. During the gunfight, Kate is forced to kill a Federal and is left visibly disturbed by the violence. Back in the U.S., Alejandro tortures Guillermo and learns that the cartel uses a tunnel near Nogales, Sonora to smuggle drugs. Meanwhile, Kate confronts Matt, who reveals that the real mission is to disrupt Díaz's drug operations so he will lead them to his boss, drug lord Fausto Alarcón. Unnerved, Kate asks Reggie to join her for support.

The task force raids a bank used to launder Díaz's money. After finding financial evidence, Kate and Reggie want to start a legal case against Díaz but are ordered to stand down to avoid jeopardizing the operation. At a bar, Reggie introduces Kate to Ted, a Phoenix police officer. Kate and Ted become intimate at her apartment, but she realizes Ted is working with the cartel. In the ensuing struggle, Ted strangles Kate before Alejandro appears and subdues him. Alejandro and Matt brutally beat Ted to coerce him into revealing the names of other officers working for Díaz.

After the team learns that Díaz has been recalled to Mexico, they prepare to raid the tunnel near Nogales. Matt reveals to Kate and Reggie that their involvement is a technical necessity as the CIA is not allowed to operate alone within US borders. An angered Reggie tells Kate they should leave, but she insists on staying to learn about the mission's true purpose. As a gunfight with the cartel begins, Kate follows Alejandro into Mexico. She sees him abduct Silvio, a corrupt Sonora police officer working as one of Díaz's drug mules. Kate attempts to arrest Alejandro, but he shoots her in her Kevlar vest before driving away with Silvio at gunpoint. On the U.S. side of the border, Kate confronts Matt, who explains the mission is part of a broader operation to consolidate the cartels into a single entity that the U.S. can more easily control. Alejandro, who previously worked for the Medellín Cartel in Colombia, was hired to assassinate Alarcón, the man responsible for ordering the murder of Alejandro's wife and daughter when he was a prosecutor in Juárez. Alejandro kills Silvio after he stops Díaz's vehicle and forces Díaz to drive to Alarcón's estate. On arrival, he quickly kills Díaz, Alarcón's guards, his wife, two sons, and Alarcón.

The next day, Alejandro appears in Kate's apartment and forces her at gunpoint to sign a statement attesting that the entire operation was legal. As he leaves, she aims her pistol at him and Alejandro turns to face her, but she cannot bring herself to pull the trigger. In Nogales, Silvio's widow watches her son's football game, which is briefly interrupted by the sound of distant gunfire.

Cast

Production

In December 2013, it was announced that Denis Villeneuve would direct a Mexican border drama, Sicario, from a screenplay by Taylor Sheridan. It is the first installment in Sheridan's neo-western trilogy exploring crime on "the modern-day American frontier". Black Label Media financed and co-produced with Thunder Road Pictures. Basil Iwanyk produced the film along with Molly Smith, Trent Luckinbill, and Thad Luckinbill.

Emily Blunt became involved with the film in April 2014, shortly followed by Benicio del Toro. Jon Bernthal and Josh Brolin joined the film in May, and cinematographer Roger Deakins was also hired. Daniel Kaluuya, Maximiliano Hernández, and Jeffrey Donovan were then cast, and Jóhann Jóhannsson was hired to compose the film's musical score in August 2014.

Principal photography began on June 30, 2014, in Albuquerque, New Mexico.

Music

Jóhann Jóhannsson was selected to write and compose the score for the film, making Sicario his second collaboration with director Denis Villeneuve.

Release

In May 2014, Lionsgate acquired the U.S. rights to the film, while Lionsgate International handled the foreign sales with Disney's Buena Vista International distributing the movie in Russia as the first film in an output deal with Lionsgate. On February 23, 2015, Lionsgate set the film for a limited release in the United States on September 18, 2015, and a wide release on October 2, 2015. The film had its world premiere at the 2015 Cannes Film Festival on May 19, 2015. It was then selected to be shown in the Special Presentations section of the 2015 Toronto International Film Festival on September 11, 2015.

Home media

Sicario was released on Blu-ray and DVD on January 5, 2016, and on 4K UHD Blu-ray on March 1, 2016.

Reception

Box office

Sicario grossed $46.9 million in the United States and Canada, and $38 million in other territories, for a worldwide total of $84.9 million, against a production budget of $30 million.

Released alongside The Martian and The Walk, Sicario was projected to make $8–10 million in its wide release opening weekend. On its first day, the film grossed $4.3 million. In its opening weekend, it grossed $12.1 million, exceeding expectations, and finished behind The Martian and Hotel Transylvania 2. In the second weekend the film made $7.6 million, dropping 38% and finishing fifth.

Critical response

On Rotten Tomatoes, the film has an approval rating of 92% based on 280 reviews, with an average rating of 8.10/10. The site's critical consensus reads: "Led by outstanding work from Emily Blunt and Benicio del Toro, Sicario is a taut, tightly wound thriller with much more on its mind than attention-getting set pieces." On Metacritic, the film has a weighted average score of 82 out of 100, based on 48 reviews, indicating "universal acclaim". Audiences polled by CinemaScore gave the film an average grade of "A−" on an A+ to F scale.

Richard Roeper gave the film an A, calling it one of the year's best, and applauded del Toro's performance, saying: "...then there's del Toro, who lurks about the fringes of the action for most of the story, and then springs into action in a handful of scenes in a variety of ways that will leave you shaken—and grateful to have seen such beautifully dark work." Dan Jolin from Empire magazine gave the film 5 stars, calling it "a beautifully murky, hard-edged thriller. Quite simply, one of the best films of the year."

Peter Bradshaw of The Guardian praised the acting of Emily Blunt, Benicio del Toro, and Josh Brolin. He stated that although her character Kate Macer was implausible, Emily Blunt "brazens out any possible absurdity with great acting focus and front". Chris Ryan of Grantland compared Sicario with the 1979 film Apocalypse Now directed by Francis Ford Coppola, noting an analogy between the former's themes with respect to the Mexican Drug War and the latter's with respect to the Vietnam War. He also stated that the characters Alejandro Gillick and Matt Graver in Sicario resemble those of Colonel Walter E. Kurtz and Lieutenant Colonel William Kilgore, respectively, from Apocalypse Now.

Mark Kermode said, "What makes this work is that Emily Blunt is terrific, and Benicio del Toro has this eye-catching appearance as a riddle and an enigma... and that the film is very, very well directed."

Controversy

Before the film's release, the mayor of Ciudad Juárez, Enrique Serrano Escobar, urged citizens to boycott it, believing the film presented a false and negative image of the city. He said the violence depicted in the film was accurate until about 2010, and that the city had since made progress in restoring peace.

Accolades

Among other accolades, the film received three Academy Award nominations, for Best Cinematography, Best Original Score, and Best Sound Editing.

Themes

Director Denis Villeneuve said the film was indeed conceived at the height of the violence in Juárez in 2010. According to Sebastian Rotella, an American foreign correspondent and investigative journalist, Sicario examines many aspects of the U.S. War on Drugs against, most generally, drug cartels in Mexico, Central, and South America. He noted that the illegal drug trafficking situation in Mexico has remained largely stagnant in the two decades prior to the film's release and that the film asserts that the American War on Drugs is "turning us into the very monsters we are trying to defeat." Rotella asserted that progress has been made in Mexico, and expressed qualms over the depiction of the film's extralegal "black ops campaign", relative to his experience that most U.S. operations resulted in the legal arrest and prosecution of drug lords.

Sequels

Lionsgate commissioned a sequel centering on del Toro's character, subtitled Soldado. The project was overseen by writer Taylor Sheridan. In April 2016, producers Molly Smith and Trent Luckinbill said del Toro and Brolin would return. In June 2016, Italian filmmaker Stefano Sollima was hired to direct, with Villeneuve no longer available due to scheduling conflicts. Principal photography began on November 8, 2016 in New Mexico. Sicario: Day of the Soldado was released in the United States on June 29, 2018 to generally positive reviews.

A third film, titled Sicario: Capos, was announced prior to release of the second film, and as of February 2021, producer Molly Smith said it was still in development.

References

External links 

 
 

2015 films
2015 action thriller films
2015 crime drama films
2015 crime thriller films
2010s English-language films
American action thriller films
American crime drama films
American crime thriller films
American mystery films
Black Label Media films
Films about the Central Intelligence Agency
Films about Delta Force
Films about drugs
Films about the Federal Bureau of Investigation
Films about Mexican drug cartels
Films directed by Denis Villeneuve
Films produced by Basil Iwanyk
Films scored by Jóhann Jóhannsson
Films set in Mexico
Films set in Texas
Films set in New Mexico
Films set in Arizona
Films shot in New Mexico
Films with screenplays by Taylor Sheridan
Lionsgate films
Sicario (film series)
Thunder Road Films films
2010s American films
2010s Mexican films